Meisl is a surname. Notable persons with that name include:

 Hugo Meisl (1881–1937), Austrian football coach and referee
 Karl Meisl (1775–1853), Austrian dramatist
 Luca Meisl (born 1999), Austrian footballer 
 Willy Meisl (1895–1968), Austrian sports journalist, brother of Hugo Meisl

German-language surnames